The Federation of Free Workers (FFW) is a national trade union center in the Philippines. It was founded 19 June 1950, and has a dues-paying membership of around 40,000.

The FFW is affiliated with the International Trade Union Confederation.

References

Sharon Quinsaat's Article entitled "Global Issues, Local Target: The Campaign against a New WTO Round in the Philippines in Teresa Encarnation Tandem, "Global Civil Society Movements in the Philippines", ANVIL Publishing, Inc, 2011, p77.
http://globalbalita.com/2012/10/15/we-commit-to-peace/Philippine Star, October 15, 2012
Anna Marie Karaos
https://archive.today/20130116131606/http://rp1.abs-cbnnews.com/video/nation/05/01/12/labor-group-slams-massive-contractualization
https://archive.today/20130416095829/http://www.malaya.com.ph/index.php/news/national/2554-not-what-they-wanted-to-hear
http://newsinfo.inquirer.net/185623/government-rejects-p125-pay-hike-cites-p1-43-t-tab
Federation of Free Workers, June 1950-June 2010, 60 Years of Empowering Workers, 60th Anniversary FFW Souveiner Magazine.
Nina Copuz, ABS-CBN News, July 7, 2010.
Bulletin Today, April 11, 2009
http://newsflavor.com/world/middle-east/for-on-time-action-to-rescue-ofws-in-libya-labor-group-federation-of-free-workers-lauded-aquino-administration/#ixzz1WUh3pLlR
http://newsinfo.inquirer.net/116435/rich-urged-to-take-in-homeless-families
https://web.archive.org/web/20141114082838/http://www.philgreenjobs.dole.gov.ph/nimda/upload/cv_matula.pdf
https://web.archive.org/web/20120418114943/http://philgreenjobs.dole.gov.ph/news.php
https://web.archive.org/web/20121007005818/http://www.catholicworker.org/dorothyday/daytext.cfm?TextID=655&SearchTerm=Marx
http://www.rappler.com/nation/politics/elections/2016/109396-pro-bono-labor-lawyer-runs-senator
https://web.archive.org/web/20151117025955/http://www.interaksyon.com/article/118766/lp-originals-in-lanao-go-una-pre-ml-activists-labor-leader-back-binay
https://www.equaltimes.org/what-can-workers-in-the?lang=en#.Wk4uP7eWbIU

External links
 FFW official site.

National trade-union centers of the Philippines
International Trade Union Confederation
Trade unions established in 1950
Anti-communist organizations in the Philippines
Anti-capitalist organizations
1950 establishments in the Philippines